Kone Prosa Srey  is a 2007 Khmer TV soap opera directed by Parn Puong Bopha starring Duch Sophea. The opera is widely considered as the sparkling flame of Khmer soap operas.

Critical reception
Proving highly successful, the 2006 opera brought a new wave in the Khmer film Industry starting an era of TV operas in 2007.

2006 Cambodian television series debuts
Cambodian television soap operas
2000s Cambodian television series
Cambodian Television Network original programming